The 2014–15 Tunisian Men’s Basketball League is the 60th season of Tunisia's premier professional men's basketball league. It is organized by the Fédération Tunisienne de Basketball.

Teams

Group A
 Club Africain
 CA Bizertin
 EO Goulette et Kram
 Ezzahra Sports
 Gazelec Sport de Tunis
 JS Kairouan
 US Monastir

Group B
 AS Hammamet
 Club Sportif des Cheminots
 ES Radès
 Étoile du Sahel
 JS El Menzah
 Sfax Railways Sports
 Stade Nabeulien

Regular season

Win: 2 points, Loss: 1 point

Group A

Group B

Playoffs

Championship playoff
Win: 2 points, Loss: 1 point
Club Africain and Étoile du Sahel started the playoff with 1 bonus point since each team won its group in regular season.

Updated to games played on 14 March 2015.
(Q)=Qualified to the phase of tournament indicated.

Super Playoffs
The winner of the Championship Playoff will play against the fourth, and the second will play against the third. In the super playoffs, a team needs 2 victories to advance to the finals, in which 2 victories are needed to win the title.
Teams that secured a spot in the super playoffs are:
 Étoile Sportive de Radès (game 11 out of 14)
 Club Africain (game 11 out of 14)
 Étoile du Sahel (game 12 out of 14)
 US Monastir (game 13 out of 14)

Semifinals

(1) Étoile Sportive de Radès vs. (4) US Monastir

(2) Club Africain vs. (3) Étoile du Sahel

Finals

Game 1

Game 2

References

External links
 Tunisian Basketball Federation
 Division I standings and results
 Division I games

Tunisian Division I Basketball League
2014–15 in basketball leagues
2014 in African basketball
2015 in African basketball
basketball
basketball